1992 Bangladesh pogroms was a series of violence against the Bengali Hindus and other non-Muslim minorities of Bangladesh, by Islamists in protest against the demolition of Babri Masjid and violence against Muslims in India. The incidents of violence began in December 1992 and continued till March 1993.

On 7 December, the Dhakeshwari temple was attacked. The Bholanath Giri Ashram in Dhaka was attacked and looted. Hindu owned jewellery shops were looted in old Dhaka. Hindu houses in Rayerbazar were set on fire.

The SAARC Quadrangular cricket tournament was affected due to the riots. On 7 December, 5,000 Muslims armed with iron rods and bamboo sticks tried to storm into the Dhaka National Stadium, where the match between Bangladesh and India A was under progress. The police fired tear gas and rubber bullets to stave off the attackers, but the match was abandoned after 8.1 overs. The organizers rescheduled the match on 10 December and the final between India A and Pakistan A on 11 December, but both of them were eventually cancelled.

On 8 December, Hindus were attacked in Kutubdia Upazila in Cox's Bazar District. Muslims attacked 14 Hindu temples, eight of them were burnt and six damaged. 51 Hindu houses in Ali Akbar Dale and another 30 in Choufaldandi. In Sylhet, one house was burnt in the heart of the town and 10 other temples were torched.

In Chittagong District, the Fatikchari and Mireswari villages were burnt completely. Five Hindu temples including Panchanan Dham and Tulsi Dham were attacked and damaged.

By the time the situation cooled off a total of 10 people were reportedly killed, 11 Hindu temples and several homes destroyed.

See also
 1962 Rajshahi massacres
 1964 East-Pakistan riots
 1971 Bangladesh genocide
 Operation Searchlight
 Chuknagar massacre
 Jathibhanga massacre
 Shankharipara massacre
 Razakar 
 1989 Bangladesh pogroms
 1990 Bangladesh anti-Hindu violence
 1992 Bangladesh violence
 2012 Chirirbandar violence
 2012 Fatehpur violence
 2012 Hathazari violence
 2012 Ramu violence
 2013 Bangladesh Anti-Hindu violence
 2014 Bangladesh anti-Hindu violence
 2016 Nasirnagar Violence
 Noakhali riots 
 Persecution of indigenous peoples in Bangladesh
 Persecution of Hindus in Bangladesh
 Persecution of Buddhists in Bangladesh
 Persecution of Chakma buddhists
 Persecution of Ahmadis in Bangladesh
 Persecution of Christians in Bangladesh
 Persecution of atheists and secularists in Bangladesh
 Freedom of religion in Bangladesh
 Human rights in Bangladesh

References 

1992 crimes in Bangladesh
Anti-Hindu violence in Bangladesh
20th-century Hinduism
December 1992 events in Asia
January 1993 events in Asia
February 1993 events in Asia
March 1993 events in Asia